Tom Pitstra (born 6 August 1949, Leeuwarden) is a Dutch politician.

See also
List of Dutch politicians

References

1949 births
Living people
GroenLinks politicians
Dutch republicans
Members of the House of Representatives (Netherlands)
Members of the Senate (Netherlands)
People from Leeuwarden